Dresden-Cotta is a railway station located in Dresden, Germany. The station is located on the Berlin–Dresden railway. The train services are operated by Deutsche Bahn.

Train services 
The following services currently call at the station:

Local services  Elsterwerda-Biehla - Großenhain - Coswig - Cossebaude - Dresden

External links

References 

Cotta